The 2021 WNBA season was the 25th season for the Los Angeles Sparks of the Women's National Basketball Association. The season tipped off on May 14, 2021 versus the Dallas Wings.

The Sparks split time in two arenas during the 2021 season.  They played at the Los Angeles Convention Center from May until July and then played at the Staples Center after the league took its Olympic break.

The Sparks started the season slowly, losing the first two games.  However, they won the next two to finish May with a 2–2 record.  June proved difficult, as the team couldn't sustain a winning streak, as wins were followed by two losses frequently.  They finished June 4–7 and 6–9 overall.  The Sparks went into the Olympic break on a low note when they lost all four games in July.  After the break, a favorable schedule contributed to a four game winning streak to begin the August schedule, with wins over Indiana and Atlanta who finished in the bottom two of the final regular season standings.  Once the winning streak ended, the Sparks lost six straight games to slide to 10–19 going into the final three games of the season.  Despite winning two of the last three, a final day loss meant the Sparks finished outside the playoff places with a 12–20 overall record.

Transactions

WNBA Draft

Trades/Roster Changes

Roster

Game log

Preseason

|- style="background:#bbffbb;"
| 1
| May 2
| @ Las Vegas
| W 80–71
| colspan=3 | Scrimmage
| Michelob Ultra ArenaNo Fans
| 1–0
|- style="background:#ffc"
| 2
| May 8
| Las Vegas
| T 85–85
| Jasmine Walker (23)
| Jasmine Walker (9)
| WheelerCooper (5)
| Los Angeles Convention CenterNo Fans
| 1–0–1

Regular season

|- style="background:#fcc;"
| 1
| May 14
| Dallas
| L 71–94
| Nneka Ogwumike (18)
| Nneka Ogwumike (8)
| Brittney Sykes (3)
| Los Angeles Convention CenterNo Fans
| 0–1
|- style="background:#fcc;"
| 2
| May 21
| @ Las Vegas
| 69–97
| Nneka Ogwumike (19)
| GuirantesC. OgwumikeN. Ogwumike (5)
| Kristi Toliver (5)
| Michelob Ultra Arena1,972
| 0–2
|- style="background:#bbffbb;"
| 3
| May 28
| @ Chicago
| W 76–61
| Nneka Ogwumike (14)
| Nneka Ogwumike (9)
| Erica Wheeler (6)
| Wintrust Arena1,124
| 1–2
|- style="background:#bbffbb;"
| 4
| May 30
| @ Chicago
| W 82–79
| Nneka Ogwumike (21)
| Nneka Ogwumike (9)
| Erica Wheeler (7)
| Wintrust Arena1,124
| 2–2

|- style="background:#fcc;" 
| 5
| June 1
| @ Dallas
| L 69–79
| Kristi Toliver (14)
| Nia Coffey (6)
| Te'a Cooper (4)
| College Park Center1,372
| 2–3
|- style="background:#bbffbb;"
| 6
| June 3
| Indiana
| W 98–63
| Kristi Toliver (22)
| HolmesZahui B (7)
| Erica Wheeler (5)
| Los Angeles Convention Center301
| 3–3
|- style="background:#bbffbb;"
| 7
| June 5
| Chicago
| W 68–63
| Erica Wheeler (22)
| Amanda Zahui B (10)
| Erica Wheeler (5)
| Los Angeles Convention Center430
| 4-3
|- style="background:#fcc;"
| 8
| June 10
| @ Washington
| L 71–89
| Te'a Cooper (11)
| Kristine Anigwe (9)
| Erica Wheeler (4)
| Entertainment and Sports Arena2,100
| 4–4
|- style="background:#fcc;"
| 9
| June 12
| @ Minnesota
| L 64–80
| Te'a Cooper (17)
| Amanda Zahui B (8)
| Kristi Toliver (5)
| Target Center2,203
| 4–5
|- style="background:#bbffbb;"
| 10
| June 16
| Phoenix
| W 85–80
| Erica Wheeler (18)
| Brittney Sykes (9)
| Erica Wheeler (10)
| Los Angeles Convention Center514
| 5–5
|- style="background:#fcc;" 
| 11
| June 18
| Phoenix
| L 66–80
| Erica Wheeler (17)
| Amanda Zahui B (6)
| ToliverWheeler (2)
| Los Angeles Convention Center520
| 5–6
|- style="background:#fcc;"
| 12
| June 20
| New York
| L 73–76
| Erica Wheeler (20)
| Erica Wheeler (6)
| Erica Wheeler (10)
| Los Angeles Convention Center731
| 5–7
|- style="background:#bbffbb;"
| 13
| June 24
| Washington
| W 89–82
| Te'a Cooper (26)
| Amanda Zahui B (5)
| Te'a Cooper (4)
| Los Angeles Convention Center520
| 6–7
|- style="background:#fcc;"
| 14
| June 26
| @ Phoenix
| L 79–88
| Erica Wheeler (21)
| Kristine Anigwe (9)
| SykesWheeler (4)
| Phoenix Suns Arena
| 6–8
|- style="background:#fcc;" 
| 15
| June 30
| Las Vegas
| L 75–99
| Amanda Zahui B (22)
| Amanda Zahui B (9)
| CooperWheeler (3)
| Los Angeles Convention Center746
| 6–9

|- style="background:#fcc;"
| 16
| July 2
| Las Vegas
| L 58–66
| Erica Wheeler (15)
| Amanda Zahui B (12)
| Erica Wheeler (5)
| Los Angeles Convention Center959
| 6–10
|- style="background:#fcc;"
| 17
| July 4
| Seattle
| L 74–84
| SykesWheeler (19)
| Brittney Sykes (10)
| SykesWheeler (5)
| Los Angeles Convention Center716
| 6–11
|- style="background:#fcc;" 
| 18
| July 7
| @ Seattle
| L 62–71
| Erica Wheeler (22)
| Amanda Zahui B (9)
| Erica Wheeler (3)
| Angel of the Winds Arena2,730
| 6–12
|- style="background:#fcc;" 
| 19
| July 11
| Minnesota
| L 61–86
| SykesWheeler (14)
| Lauren Cox (8)
| Erica Wheeler (6)
| Los Angeles Convention Center892
| 6–13

|- style="background:#bbffbb;"
| 20
| August 15
| Indiana
| W 75–70
| Brittney Sykes (16)
| Amanda Zahui B (9)
| ToliverWheeler (6)
| Staples Center2,029
| 7–13
|- style="background:#bbffbb;"
| 21
| August 17
| Atlanta
| W 85–80 (OT)
| Brittney Sykes (17)
| Nneka Ogwumike (9)
| Nneka Ogwumike (9)
| Staples Center2,200
| 8–13
|- style="background:#bbffbb;"
| 22
| August 19
| Atlanta
| W 66–64
| Nneka Ogwumike (17)
| Brittney Sykes (8)
| Kristi Toliver (5)
| Staples Center1,885
| 9–13
|- style="background:#bbffbb;"
| 23
| August 22
| @ New York
| W 86–83
| Erica Wheeler (17)
| Brittney Sykes (6)
| Nneka Ogwumike (6)
| Barclays CenterN/A
| 10–13
|- style="background:#fcc;"
| 24
| August 24
| @ Washington
| L 68–78
| Nia Coffey (15)
| Chiney Ogwumike (8)
| ToliverSykes (3)
| Entertainment and Sports Arena2,620
| 10–14
|- style="background:#fcc;"
| 25
| August 26
| @ Connecticut
| L 72–76
| Nia Coffey (18)
| Brittney Sykes (7)
| Erica Wheeler (9)
| Mohegan Sun Arena3,702
| 10–15
|- style="background:#fcc;"
| 26
| August 28
| @ Connecticut
| L 61–76
| Erica Wheeler (15)
| Erica Wheeler (6)
| Erica Wheeler (7)
| Mohegan Sun Arena4,434
| 10–16
|- style="background:#fcc;"
| 27
| August 31
| @ Indiana
| L 72–74
| Nneka Ogwumike (17)
| Brittney Sykes (5)
| Erica Wheeler (7)
| Indiana Farmers ColiseumN/A
| 10–17

|- style="background:#fcc;"
| 28
| September 2
| @ Minnesota
| L 57–66
| N. OgwumikeWheeler (16)
| Nneka Ogwumike (10)
| Erica Wheeler (7)
| Target Center3,121
| 10–18
|- style="background:#fcc;"
| 29
| September 9
| Connecticut
| L 57–75
| CoffeyN. Ogwumike (12)
| Nneka Ogwumike (7)
| N. OgwumikeSykesWheeler (3)
| Staples Center1,695
| 10–19
|- style="background:#bbffbb;"
| 30
| September 12
| Seattle
| W 81–53
| Te'a Cooper (19)
| Brittney Sykes (10)
| Erica Wheeler (4)
| Staples Center4,181
| 11–19
|- style="background:#bbffbb;"
| 31
| September 16
| @ Atlanta
| W 74–68
| Brittney Sykes (17)
| Nneka Ogwumike (10)
| Erica Wheeler (4)
| Gateway Center Arena2,537
| 12–19
|- style="background:#fcc;"
| 32
| September 19
| @ Dallas
| L 84–87
| Te'a Cooper (24)
| Nneka Ogwumike (10)
| Erica Wheeler (7)
| College Park Center3,604
| 12–20

Standings

Statistics

Source:

Regular Season

Awards and honors

References

External links

Los Angeles Sparks at ESPN.com

Los Angeles Sparks seasons
Los Angeles
Los Angeles Sparks